USS Keresan (ID-1806) was a United States Navy cargo ship in commission from 1918 to 1919.

Construction and early career
Keresan was launched in 1912 as the commercial cargo ship SS Electra for an Austro-Hungarian firm, but was sold prior to completion to another Austro-Hungarian company, M. V. Martinolich and Company, and renamed SS Erodiade. At the beginning of World War I in August 1914, Erodiade took refuge at Buenos Aires in neutral Argentina to avoid capture or destruction by Allied naval forces and was laid up there.

The United States seized all Central Powers ships in Western Hemisphere ports upon entering World War I on the Allied side in April 1917, and all Austro-Hungarian ships seized were purchased by American interests. The Kerr Navigation Company of New York City purchased Erodiade and seven other seized Austro-Hungarian cargo ships. Renamed SS Keresan, the ship went into commercial service with Kerr. Later in 1917 or in 1918, the United States Army chartered Keresan for carrying cargo to U.S. Army forces operating in Europe.

United States Navy service
The U.S. Navy took control of Keresan on 18 September 1918, assigned her the naval registry Identification Number (Id. No.) 1806, and commissioned her the same day as USS Keresan.

Assigned to the Naval Overseas Transportation Service, Keresan departed New York City on 1 October 1918 with a cargo of ammunition for American forces in Europe. Following the Armistice with Germany of 11 November 1918, Keresan returned to the United States in ballast, arriving at New York on 13 December 1918.

Keresan steamed to Buenos Aires in January 1919 with general cargo, arriving in February 1919. Delayed at Buenos Aires by a strike, she finally departed in early May 1919 with a cargo of maize and returned to New York on 5 June 1919.

Keresan was decommissioned on 26 June 1919 and transferred the same day to the United States Shipping Board for simultaneous return to Kerr Navigation.

Later career
The ship returned to commercial service as SS Keresan. She was sold to another American firm and became SS Mount Seward in 1921, then sold again in 1922, to a Hungarian firm that named her SS Debreczen. A British company bought her in 1927 and renamed her SS Fenwell, then sold her in 1928 to another British firm, which named her Chislehurst. Sold to a Shanghai, China-based firm in 1933, she became first SS Yolande B and then SS Yolande before being wrecked near Weihaiwei, China, on 5 March 1938.

References

Department of the Navy: Naval Historical Center Online Library of Selected Images:  U.S. Navy Ships: USS Keresan (ID # 1806), 1918-1919. Originally S.S. Erodiade (Austrian Freighter, 1912). Later American S.S. Keresan
NavSource Online: Section Patrol Craft Photo Archive: Keresan (ID 1806)

World War I cargo ships of the United States
Ships built on the River Wear
1911 ships
Cargo ships of the United States Navy